KXOQ (104.3 FM, "The Quake") is an American radio station licensed to serve Kennett, Missouri, United States.  The station's broadcast license is held by P.M. Broadcasting, Inc., and it operates as part of the Poplar Bluff-based Fox Radio Network.

KXOQ broadcasts a classic rock format with some programming from Westwood One.

History
In July 1993, Eagle Bluff Enterprises applied to the Federal Communications Commission (FCC) for a construction permit for a new broadcast radio station. The FCC granted this permit on March 30, 1994, with a scheduled expiration date of September 30, 1995. The new station was assigned call sign "KOLW" on June 30, 1995. After construction began, the station was assigned new call sign "KXOQ" by FCC on November 1, 1995.

In late November 1995, permit holder Eagle Bluff Enterprises agreed to transfer the construction permit to P.M. Broadcasting, Inc. The FCC approved the transfer on February 14, 1996, and the transaction was formally consummated on February 6, 1996. After station construction and testing were completed, KXOQ was granted its broadcast license on April 12, 1996.

References

External links
Fox Radio Stations official website

XOQ
Classic rock radio stations in the United States
Dunklin County, Missouri
Radio stations established in 1993
1993 establishments in Missouri